Portuguese ( or, in full) is a western Romance language of the Indo-European language family, originating in the Iberian Peninsula of Europe. It is an official language of Portugal, Brazil, Cape Verde, Angola, Mozambique, Guinea-Bissau and São Tomé and Príncipe, while having co-official language status in East Timor, Equatorial Guinea, and Macau. A Portuguese-speaking person or nation is referred to as "Lusophone". As the result of expansion during colonial times, a cultural presence of Portuguese speakers is also found around the world. Portuguese is part of the Ibero-Romance group that evolved from several dialects of Vulgar Latin in the medieval Kingdom of Galicia and the County of Portugal, and has kept some Celtic phonology in its lexicon.

With approximately 230 million native speakers and 25-30 million second language speakers, Portuguese has approximately 260 million total speakers. It is usually listed as the sixth-most spoken language, the third-most spoken European language in the world in terms of native speakers and the second-most spoken Romance language in the world, surpassed only by Spanish. Being the most widely spoken language in South America and all of the Southern Hemisphere, it is also the second-most spoken language, after Spanish, in Latin America, one of the 10 most spoken languages in Africa, and an official language of the European Union, Mercosur, the Organization of American States, the Economic Community of West African States, the African Union, and the Community of Portuguese Language Countries, an international organization made up of all of the world's officially Lusophone nations. In 1997, a comprehensive academic study ranked Portuguese as one of the 10 most influential languages in the world.

History 

When the Romans arrived in the Iberian Peninsula in 216 BC, they brought with them the Latin language, from which all Romance languages are descended. The language was spread by Roman soldiers, settlers, and merchants, who built Roman cities mostly near the settlements of previous Celtic civilizations established long before the Roman arrivals. For that reason, the language has kept a relevant substratum of much older, Atlantic European Megalithic Culture and Celtic culture, part of the Hispano-Celtic group of ancient languages. In Latin, the Portuguese language is known as lusitana or (latina) lusitanica, after the Lusitanians, a Celtic tribe that lived in the territory of present-day Portugal and Spain that adopted the Latin language as Roman settlers moved in. This is also the origin of the luso- prefix, seen in terms like "Lusophone".

Between AD 409 and AD 711, as the Roman Empire collapsed in Western Europe, the Iberian Peninsula was conquered by Germanic peoples of the Migration Period. The occupiers, mainly Suebi, Visigoths and Buri who originally spoke Germanic languages, quickly adopted late Roman culture and the Vulgar Latin dialects of the peninsula and over the next 300 years totally integrated into the local populations. Some Germanic words from that period are part of the Portuguese lexicon. With the Umayyad conquest beginning in 711, Arabic became the administrative and common language in the conquered regions, but most of the remaining Christian population continued to speak a form of Romance called Mozarabic which introduced a few hundred words from Arabic as well as Persian, Turkish, and Berber. Like other Neo-Latin and European languages, Portuguese has adopted a significant number of loanwords from Greek, mainly in technical and scientific terminology. These borrowings occurred via Latin, and later during the Middle Ages and the Renaissance.

Portuguese evolved from the medieval language, known today by linguists as Galician-Portuguese, Old Portuguese or Old Galician, of the northwestern medieval Kingdom of Galicia of which the County of Portugal was part. It is in Latin administrative documents of the 9th century that written Galician-Portuguese words and phrases are first recorded. This phase is known as Proto-Portuguese, which lasted from the 9th century until the 12th-century independence of the County of Portugal from the Kingdom of León, which had by then assumed reign over Galicia.

In the first part of the Galician-Portuguese period (from the 12th to the 14th century), the language was increasingly used for documents and other written forms. For some time, it was the language of preference for lyric poetry in Christian Hispania, much as Occitan was the language of the poetry of the troubadours in France. The Occitan digraphs lh and nh, used in its classical orthography, were adopted by the orthography of Portuguese, presumably by Gerald of Braga, a monk from Moissac, who became bishop of Braga in Portugal in 1047, playing a major role in modernizing written Portuguese using classical Occitan norms. Portugal became an independent kingdom in 1139, under King Afonso I of Portugal. In 1290, King Denis of Portugal created the first Portuguese university in Lisbon (the Estudos Gerais, which later moved to Coimbra) and decreed for Portuguese, then simply called the "common language," to be known as the Portuguese language and used officially.

In the second period of Old Portuguese, in the 15th and 16th centuries, with the Portuguese discoveries, the language was taken to many regions of Africa, Asia, and the Americas. By the mid-16th century, Portuguese had become a lingua franca in Asia and Africa, used not only for colonial administration and trade but also for communication between local officials and Europeans of all nationalities. The Portuguese expanded across South America, across Africa to the Pacific Ocean, taking their language with them.

Its spread was helped by mixed marriages between Portuguese and local people and by its association with Roman Catholic missionary efforts, which led to the formation of creole languages such as that called Kristang in many parts of Asia (from the word cristão, "Christian"). The language continued to be popular in parts of Asia until the 19th century. Some Portuguese-speaking Christian communities in India, Sri Lanka, Malaysia, and Indonesia preserved their language even after they were isolated from Portugal.

The end of the Old Portuguese period was marked by the publication of the Cancioneiro Geral by Garcia de Resende, in 1516. The early times of Modern Portuguese, which spans the period from the 16th century to the present day, were characterized by an increase in the number of learned words borrowed from Classical Latin and Classical Greek because of the Renaissance (learned words borrowed from Latin also came from Renaissance Latin, the form of Latin during that time), which greatly enriched the lexicon. Most literate Portuguese speakers were also literate in Latin; and thus they easily adopted Latin words into their writing, and eventually speech, in Portuguese.

Portuguese is also termed "the language of Camões," after Luís Vaz de Camões, one of the greatest literary figures in the Portuguese language and author of the Portuguese epic poem The Lusiads.

In March 2006, the Museum of the Portuguese Language, an interactive museum about the Portuguese language, was founded in São Paulo, Brazil, the city with the greatest number of Portuguese language speakers in the world. The museum is the first of its kind in the world. In 2015 the museum was partially destroyed in a fire, but restored and reopened in 2020.

Geographic distribution 

Portuguese is the native language of the vast majority of the people in Portugal, Brazil and São Tomé and Príncipe (95%). Perhaps 75% of the population of urban Angola speaks Portuguese natively, with approximately 85% fluent; these rates are lower in the countryside. Just over 50% (and rapidly increasing) of the population of Mozambique are native speakers of Portuguese, and 70% are fluent, according to the 2007 census. Portuguese is also spoken natively by 30% of the population in Guinea-Bissau, and a Portuguese-based creole is understood by all. Almost 50% of the East Timorese are fluent in Portuguese. No data is available for Cape Verde, but almost all the population is bilingual, and the monolingual population speaks the Portuguese-based Cape Verdean Creole.  Portuguese is mentioned in the Constitution of South Africa as one of the languages spoken by communities within the country for which the Pan South African Language Board was charged with promoting and ensuring respect.

There are also significant Portuguese-speaking immigrant communities in many countries including Andorra (17.1%), Bermuda, Canada (400,275 people in the 2006 census), France (1,625,000 people), Japan (400,000 people), Jersey, Luxembourg (about 25% of the population as of 2021), Namibia (about 4–5% of the population, mainly refugees from Angola in the north of the country), Paraguay (10.7% or 636,000 people), Switzerland (550,000 in 2019, learning + mother tongue), Venezuela (554,000). and the United States (0.35% of the population or 1,228,126 speakers according to the 2007 American Community Survey).

In some parts of former Portuguese India, namely Goa and Daman and Diu, the language is still spoken by about 10,000 people. In 2014, an estimated 1,500 students were learning Portuguese in Goa. Approximately 2% of the people of Macau, China are fluent speakers of Portuguese. Additionally, the language is being very actively studied in the Chinese school system right up to the doctorate level.

Official status 

The Community of Portuguese Language Countries
(in Portuguese Comunidade dos Países de Língua Portuguesa, with the Portuguese acronym CPLP) consists of the nine independent countries that have Portuguese as an official language: Angola, Brazil, Cape Verde, East Timor, Equatorial Guinea, Guinea-Bissau, Mozambique, Portugal and São Tomé and Príncipe.

Equatorial Guinea made a formal application for full membership to the CPLP in June 2010, a status given only to states with Portuguese as an official language. In 2011, Portuguese became its third official language (besides Spanish and French) and, in July 2014, the country was accepted as a member of the CPLP.

Portuguese is also one of the official languages of the Special Administrative Region of the People's Republic of China of Macau (alongside Chinese) and of several international organizations, including Mercosur, the Organization of Ibero-American States, the Union of South American Nations, the Organization of American States, the African Union, the Economic Community of West African States, the Southern African Development Community and the European Union.

Lusophone countries 
According to The World Factbooks country population estimates for 2018, the population of each of the ten jurisdictions is as follows (by descending order):

The combined population of the entire Lusophone area was estimated at 300 million in January 2022. This number does not include the Lusophone diaspora, estimated at 10 million people (including 4.5 million Portuguese, 3 million Brazilians, although it is hard to obtain official accurate numbers of diasporic Portuguese speakers because a significant portion of these citizens are naturalized citizens born outside of Lusophone territory or are children of immigrants, and may have only a basic command of the language. Additionally, a large part of the diaspora is a part of the already-counted population of the Portuguese-speaking countries and territories, such as the high number of Brazilian and PALOP emigrant citizens in Portugal or the high number of Portuguese emigrant citizens in the PALOP and Brazil.

The Portuguese language therefore serves more than 250 million people daily, who have direct or indirect legal, juridical and social contact with it, varying from the only language used in any contact, to only education, contact with local or international administration, commerce and services or the simple sight of road signs, public information and advertising in Portuguese.

Portuguese as a foreign language 
Portuguese is a mandatory subject in the school curriculum in Uruguay. Other countries where Portuguese is commonly taught in schools or where it has been introduced as an option include Venezuela, Zambia, the Republic of the Congo, Senegal, Namibia, Eswatini, South Africa, Ivory Coast, and Mauritius. In 2017, a project was launched to introduce Portuguese as a school subject in Zimbabwe. Also, according to Portugal's Minister of Foreign Affairs, the language will be part of the school curriculum of a total of 32 countries by 2020. In the countries listed below, Portuguese is spoken either as a native language by vast majorities due to the Portuguese colonial past or as a lingua franca in bordering and multilingual regions, such as on the border between Brazil and Uruguay & Paraguay, as well as Angola and Namibia. In many other countries, Portuguese is spoken by majorities as a second language. And there are still communities of thousands of Portuguese (or Creole) first language speakers in Goa, Sri Lanka, Kuala Lumpur, Daman and Diu, etc. due to Portuguese colonization. In East Timor, the number of Portuguese speakers is quickly increasing as Portuguese and Brazilian teachers are making great strides in teaching Portuguese in the schools all over the island. Additionally, there are many large Portuguese immigrant communities all over the world.

Future 

According to estimates by UNESCO, Portuguese is the fastest-growing European language after English and the language has, according to the newspaper The Portugal News publishing data given from UNESCO, the highest potential for growth as an international language in southern Africa and South America. Portuguese is a globalized language spoken officially on five continents, and as a second language by millions worldwide.

Since 1991, when Brazil signed into the economic community of Mercosul with other South American nations, namely Argentina, Uruguay and Paraguay, Portuguese is either mandatory, or taught, in the schools of those South American countries. 

Although early in the 21st century, after Macau was returned to China and immigration of Brazilians of Japanese descent to Japan slowed down, the use of Portuguese was in decline in Asia, it is once again becoming a language of opportunity there, mostly because of increased diplomatic and financial ties with economically powerful Portuguese-speaking countries in the world.

Current status and importance
Portuguese, being a language spread on all continents, is official in several international organizations; one of twenty official languages of the European Union, an official language of NATO, the Organization of American States (alongside Spanish, French and English), and one of eighteen official languages of the European Space Agency.

It is also a working language in nonprofit organisations such as the Red Cross (alongside English, German, Spanish, French, Arabic and Russian), Amnesty International (alongside 32 other languages of which English is the most used, followed by Spanish, French, German, and Italian), and Médecins sans Frontières (used alongside English, Spanish, French and Arabic), in addition to being the official legal language in the African Court on Human and Peoples' Rights, also in Community of Portuguese Language Countries, an international organization formed essentially by lusophone countries.

Dialects, accents and varieties 

, a pronoun meaning "you", is used for educated, formal, and colloquial respectful speech in most Portuguese-speaking regions. In a few Brazilian states such as Rio Grande do Sul, Pará, among others,  is virtually absent from the spoken language. Riograndense and European Portuguese normally distinguishes formal from informal speech by verbal conjugation. Informal speech employs  followed by second person verbs, formal language retains the formal , followed by the third person conjugation.

The predominance of Southeastern-based media products has established  as the pronoun of choice for the second person singular in both writing and multimedia communications. However, in the city of Rio de Janeiro, the country's main cultural center, the usage of  has been expanding ever since the end of the 20th century, being most frequent among youngsters, and a number of studies have also shown an increase in its use in a number of other Brazilian dialects.

Modern Standard European Portuguese ( or ) is based on the Portuguese spoken in the area including and surrounding the cities of Coimbra and Lisbon, in central Portugal. Standard European Portuguese is also the preferred standard by the Portuguese-speaking African countries. As such, and despite the fact that its speakers are dispersed around the world, Portuguese has only two dialects used for learning: the European and the Brazilian. Some aspects and sounds found in many dialects of Brazil are exclusive to South America, and cannot be found in Europe. The same occur with the Santomean, Mozambican, Bissau-Guinean, Angolan and Cape Verdean dialects, being exclusive to Africa. See Portuguese in Africa.

Audio samples of some dialects and accents of Portuguese are available below. There are some differences between the areas but these are the best approximations possible. IPA transcriptions refer to the names in local pronunciation.

Brazil 
 Caipira – Spoken in the states of São Paulo (most markedly on the countryside and rural areas); southern Minas Gerais, northern Paraná and southeastern Mato Grosso do Sul. Depending on the vision of what constitutes caipira, Triângulo Mineiro, border areas of Goiás and the remaining parts of Mato Grosso do Sul are included, and the frontier of caipira in Minas Gerais is expanded further northerly, though not reaching metropolitan Belo Horizonte. It is often said that caipira appeared by decreolization of the língua brasílica and the related língua geral paulista, then spoken in almost all of what is now São Paulo, a former lingua franca in most of the contemporary Centro-Sul of Brazil before the 18th century, brought by the bandeirantes, interior pioneers of Colonial Brazil, closely related to its northern counterpart Nheengatu, and that is why the dialect shows many general differences from other variants of the language. It has striking remarkable differences in comparison to other Brazilian dialects in phonology, prosody and grammar, often stigmatized as being strongly associated with a substandard variant, now mostly rural.
 Cearense or Costa norte – is a dialect spoken more sharply in the states of Ceará and Piauí. The variant of Ceará includes fairly distinctive traits it shares with the one spoken in Piauí, though, such as distinctive regional phonology and vocabulary (for example, a debuccalization process stronger than that of Portuguese, a different system of the vowel harmony that spans Brazil from fluminense and mineiro to amazofonia but is especially prevalent in nordestino, a very coherent coda sibilant palatalization as those of Portugal and Rio de Janeiro but allowed in fewer environments than in other accents of nordestino, a greater presence of dental stop palatalization to palato-alveolar in comparison to other accents of nordestino, among others, as well as a great number of archaic Portuguese words).
 Baiano – Found in Bahia and border regions with Goiás and Tocantins.
  Fluminense – A broad dialect with many variants spoken in the states of Rio de Janeiro, Espírito Santo and neighboring eastern regions of Minas Gerais. Fluminense formed in these previously caipira-speaking areas due to the gradual influence of European migrants, causing many people to distance their speech from their original dialect and incorporate new terms. Fluminense is sometimes referred to as carioca, however carioca is a more specific term referring to the accent of the Greater Rio de Janeiro area by speakers with a fluminense dialect.
 Gaúcho – in Rio Grande do Sul, similar to sulista. There are many distinct accents in Rio Grande do Sul, mainly due to the heavy influx of European immigrants of diverse origins who have settled in colonies throughout the state, and to the proximity to Spanish-speaking nations. The gaúcho word in itself is a Spanish loanword into Portuguese of obscure Indigenous Amerindian origins. 
 Mineiro – Minas Gerais (not prevalent in the Triângulo Mineiro). As the fluminense area, its associated region was formerly a sparsely populated land where caipira was spoken, but the discovery of gold and gems made it the most prosperous Brazilian region, what attracted Portuguese colonists, commoners from other parts of Brazil and their African slaves. South-southwestern, southeastern and northern areas of the state have fairly distinctive speech, actually approximating to caipira, fluminense (popularly called, often pejoratively, carioca do brejo, "marsh carioca") and baiano respectively. Areas including and surrounding Belo Horizonte have a distinctive accent.
  Nordestino – more marked in the Sertão (7), where, in the 19th and 20th centuries and especially in the area including and surrounding the sertão (the dry land after Agreste) of Pernambuco and southern Ceará, it could sound less comprehensible to speakers of other Portuguese dialects than Galician or Rioplatense Spanish, and nowadays less distinctive from other variants in the metropolitan cities along the coasts. It can be divided in two regional variants, one that includes the northern Maranhão and southern of Piauí, and other that goes from Ceará to Alagoas.
 Nortista or amazofonia – Most of Amazon Basin states, i.e. Northern Brazil. Before the 20th century, most people from the nordestino area fleeing the droughts and their associated poverty settled here, so it has some similarities with the Portuguese dialect there spoken. The speech in and around the cities of Belém and Manaus has a more European flavor in phonology, prosody and grammar.
 Paulistano – Variants spoken around Greater São Paulo in its maximum definition and more easterly areas of São Paulo state, as well as perhaps "educated speech" from anywhere in the state of São Paulo (where it coexists with caipira). Caipira is the hinterland sociolect of much of the Central-Southern half of Brazil, nowadays conservative only in the rural areas and associated with them, that has a historically low prestige in cities as Rio de Janeiro, Curitiba, Belo Horizonte, and until some years ago, in São Paulo itself. Sociolinguistics, or what by times is described as "linguistic prejudice", often correlated with classism, is a polemic topic in the entirety of the country since the times of Adoniran Barbosa. Also, the "Paulistano" accent was heavily influenced by the presence of immigrants in the city of São Paulo, especially the Italians.
 Sertanejo – Center-Western states, and also much of Tocantins and Rondônia. It is closer to mineiro, caipira, nordestino or nortista depending on the location.
 Sulista – The variants spoken in the areas between the northern regions of Rio Grande do Sul and southern regions of São Paulo state, encompassing most of southern Brazil. The city of Curitiba does have a fairly distinct accent as well, and a relative majority of speakers around and in Florianópolis also speak this variant (many speak florianopolitano or manezinho da ilha instead, related to the European Portuguese dialects spoken in Azores and Madeira). Speech of northern Paraná is closer to that of inland São Paulo.
 Florianopolitano – Variants heavily influenced by European Portuguese spoken in Florianópolis city (due to a heavy immigration movement from Portugal, mainly its insular regions) and much of its metropolitan area, Grande Florianópolis, said to be a continuum between those whose speech most resemble sulista dialects and those whose speech most resemble fluminense and European ones, called, often pejoratively, manezinho da ilha.
 Carioca – Not a dialect, but sociolects of the fluminense variant spoken in an area roughly corresponding to Greater Rio de Janeiro. It appeared after locals came in contact with the Portuguese aristocracy amidst the Portuguese royal family fled in the early 19th century. There is actually a continuum between Vernacular countryside accents and the carioca sociolect, and the educated speech (in Portuguese norma culta, which most closely resembles other Brazilian Portuguese standards but with marked recent Portuguese influences, the nearest ones among the country's dialects along florianopolitano), so that not all people native to the state of Rio de Janeiro speak the said sociolect, but most carioca speakers will use the standard variant not influenced by it that is rather uniform around Brazil depending on context (emphasis or formality, for example).
 Brasiliense – used in Brasília and its metropolitan area. It is not considered a dialect, but more of a regional variant – often deemed to be closer to fluminense than the dialect commonly spoken in most of Goiás, sertanejo.
 Arco do desflorestamento or serra amazônica –  Known in its region as the "accent of the migrants," it has similarities with caipira, sertanejo and often sulista that make it differing from amazofonia (in the opposite group of Brazilian dialects, in which it is placed along nordestino, baiano, mineiro and fluminense). It is the most recent dialect, which appeared by the settlement of families from various other Brazilian regions attracted by the cheap land offer in recently deforested areas.
 Recifense – used in Recife and its metropolitan area.

Portugal 

  Micaelense (Açores) (São Miguel) – Azores.
  Alentejano – Alentejo (Alentejan Portuguese), with the Oliventine subdialect.
  Algarvio – Algarve (there is a particular dialect in a small part of western Algarve).
  Minhoto – Districts of Braga and Viana do Castelo (hinterland).
  Beirão; Alto-Alentejano – Central Portugal (hinterland).
  Beirão – Central Portugal.
  Estremenho – Regions of Coimbra and Lisbon (this is a disputed denomination, as Coimbra and is not part of "Estremadura", and the Lisbon dialect has some peculiar features that are not only not shared with that of Coimbra, but also significantly distinct and recognizable to most native speakers from elsewhere in Portugal).
  Madeirense (Madeiran) – Madeira.
  Portuense – Regions of the district of Porto and parts of Aveiro.
  Transmontano – Trás-os-Montes e Alto Douro.

Other countries and dependencies 
  –  Angolano  (Angolan Portuguese)
  –  Cabo-verdiano (Cape Verdean Portuguese)
  –  Timorense (East Timorese Portuguese)
  – Damaense (Damanese Portuguese) and Goês (Goan Portuguese)
  –  Guineense (Guinean Portuguese)
  –  Macaense (Macanese Portuguese)
  –  Moçambicano (Mozambican Portuguese)
  –  Santomense (São Tomean Portuguese)
  – Dialectos Portugueses del Uruguay (DPU)

Differences between dialects are mostly of accent and vocabulary, but between the Brazilian dialects and other dialects, especially in their most colloquial forms, there can also be some grammatical differences. The Portuguese-based creoles spoken in various parts of Africa, Asia, and the Americas are independent languages.

Characterization and peculiarities 
Portuguese, like Catalan, preserves the stressed vowels of Vulgar Latin which became diphthongs in most other Romance languages; cf. Port., Cat., Sard. pedra ; Fr. , Sp. , It. , Ro. , from Lat. ("stone"); or Port. , Cat. , Sard. ; Sp. , It. , Fr. , Ro. , from Lat. ("fire"). Another characteristic of early Portuguese was the loss of intervocalic l and n, sometimes followed by the merger of the two surrounding vowels, or by the insertion of an epenthetic vowel between them: cf. Lat. ("to exit"),  ("to have"),  ("jail"), Port.

When the elided consonant was n, it often nasalized the preceding vowel: cf. Lat. This process was the source of most of the language's distinctive nasal diphthongs. In particular, the Latin endings -anem,  and  became  in most cases, cf. Lat. ("dog"),  ("brother"),  ("reason") with Modern Port.

The Portuguese language is the only Romance language that preserves the clitic case mesoclisis: cf.  (I'll give thee),  (I'll love you),  (I'll contact them). Like Galician, it also retains the Latin synthetic pluperfect tense:  (I had been),  (I had lived),  (you had lived). Romanian also has this tense, but uses the -s- form.

Vocabulary 

Most of the lexicon of Portuguese is derived, directly or through other Romance languages, from Latin. Nevertheless, because of its original Lusitanian and Celtic Gallaecian heritage, and the later participation of Portugal in the Age of Discovery, it has a relevant number of words from the ancient Hispano-Celtic group and adopted loanwords from other languages around the world.

A number of Portuguese words can still be traced to the pre-Roman inhabitants of Portugal, which included the Gallaeci, Lusitanians, Celtici and Cynetes. Most of these words derived from the Hispano-Celtic Gallaecian language of northwestern Iberia, and are very often shared with Galician since both languages have the same origin in the medieval language of Galician-Portuguese. A few of these words existed in Latin as loanwords from other Celtic sources, often Gaulish. Altogether these are over 2,000 words, some verbs and toponymic names of towns, rivers, utensils and plants.

In the 5th century, the Iberian Peninsula (the Roman Hispania) was conquered by the Germanic, Suebi and Visigoths. As they adopted the Roman civilization and language, however, these people contributed with some 500 
Germanic words to the lexicon. Many of these words are related to:

The Germanic languages influence also exists in toponymic surnames and patronymic surnames borne by Visigoth sovereigns and their descendants, and it dwells on placenames such as Ermesinde, Esposende and Resende where sinde and sende are derived from the Germanic sinths ('military expedition') and in the case of Resende, the prefix re comes from Germanic reths ('council'). Other examples of Portuguese names, surnames and town names of Germanic toponymic origin include Henrique, Henriques, Vermoim, Mandim, Calquim, Baguim, Gemunde, Guetim, Sermonde and many more, are quite common mainly in the old Suebi and later Visigothic dominated regions, covering today's Northern half of Portugal and Galicia.

Between the 9th and early 13th centuries, Portuguese acquired some 400 to 600 words from Arabic by influence of Moorish Iberia.

Starting in the 15th century, the Portuguese maritime explorations led to the introduction of many loanwords from Asian languages. For instance,  ('cutlass') from Japanese katana,  ('tea') from Chinese chá, and canja ('chicken-soup, piece of cake') from Malay.

From the 16th to the 19th centuries, because of the role of Portugal as intermediary in the Atlantic slave trade, and the establishment of large Portuguese colonies in Angola, Mozambique, and Brazil, Portuguese acquired several words of African and Amerind origin, especially names for most of the animals and plants found in those territories. While those terms are mostly used in the former colonies, many became current in European Portuguese as well. From Kimbundu, for example, came kifumate >  ('head caress') (Brazil), kusula >  ('youngest child') (Brazil),  ('tropical wasp') (Brazil), and kubungula >  ('to dance like a wizard') (Angola).

Finally, it has received a steady influx of loanwords from other European languages, especially French and English. These are by far the most important languages when referring to loanwords.

Classification and related languages 
 

Portuguese belongs to the West Iberian branch of the Romance languages, and it has special ties with the following members of this group:
 Galician, Fala and portunhol do pampa (the way riverense and its sibling dialects are referred to in Portuguese), its closest relatives.
 Mirandese, Leonese, Asturian, Extremaduran and Cantabrian (Astur-Leonese languages). Mirandese is the only recognised regional language spoken in Portugal (beside Portuguese, the only official language in Portugal).
 Spanish and calão (the way caló, language of the Iberian Romani, is referred to in Portuguese).

Portuguese and other Romance languages (namely French and Italian) share considerable similarities in both vocabulary and grammar. Portuguese speakers will usually need some formal study before attaining strong comprehension in those Romance languages, and vice versa. However, Portuguese and Galician are fully mutually intelligible, and Spanish is considerably intelligible for lusophones, owing to their genealogical proximity and shared genealogical history as West Iberian (Ibero-Romance languages), historical contact between speakers and mutual influence, shared areal features as well as modern lexical, structural, and grammatical similarity (89%) between them.

Portuñol/Portunhol, a form of code-switching, has a more lively use and is more readily mentioned in popular culture in South America. Said code-switching is not to be confused with the Portuñol spoken on the borders of Brazil with Uruguay and Paraguay, and of Portugal with Spain, that are Portuguese dialects spoken natively by thousands of people, which have been heavily influenced by Spanish.

Portuguese and Spanish are the only Ibero-Romance languages, and perhaps the only Romance languages with such thriving inter-language forms, in which visible and lively bilingual contact dialects and code-switching have formed, in which functional bilingual communication is achieved through attempting an approximation to the target foreign language (known as 'Portuñol') without a learned acquisition process, but nevertheless facilitates communication. There is an emerging literature focused on such phenomena (including informal attempts of standardization of the linguistic continua and their usage).

Galician-Portuguese in Spain 

The closest relative of Portuguese is Galician, which is spoken in the autonomous community (region) and historical nationality of Galicia (northwestern Spain). The two were at one time a single language, known today as Galician-Portuguese, but they have diverged especially in pronunciation and vocabulary due to the political separation of Portugal from Galicia. There is, however, still a linguistic continuity consisting of the variant of Galician referred to as galego-português baixo-limiao, which is spoken in several Galician and Portuguese villages within the transboundary biosphere reserve of Gerês-Xurés. It is "considered a rarity, a living vestige of the medieval language that ranged from Cantabria to Mondego [...]".
As reported by UNESCO, due to the pressure of Spanish on the standard official version of Galician and centuries-old Hispanization, the Galician language was on the verge of disappearing. According to the UNESCO philologist Tapani Salminen, the proximity to Portuguese protects Galician. The core vocabulary and grammar of Galician are noticeably closer to Portuguese than to those of Spanish and within the EU context, Galician is often considered the same language as Portuguese. Galician like Portuguese, uses the future subjunctive, the personal infinitive, and the synthetic pluperfect. Mutual intelligibility estimated at 85% is excellent between Galicians and Portuguese. Despite political efforts in Spain to define them as separate languages, many linguists consider Galician to be a co-dialect of the Portuguese language with regional variations.

Another member of the Galician-Portuguese group, most commonly thought of as a Galician dialect, is spoken in the Eonavian region in a western strip in Asturias and the westernmost parts of the provinces of León and Zamora, along the frontier with Galicia, between the Eo and Navia rivers (or more exactly Eo and Frexulfe rivers). It is called eonaviego or gallego-asturiano by its speakers.

The Fala language, known by its speakers as xalimés, mañegu, a fala de Xálima and chapurráu and in Portuguese as a fala de Xálima, a fala da Estremadura, o galego da Estremadura, valego or galaico-estremenho, is another descendant of Galician-Portuguese, spoken by a small number of people in the Spanish towns of Valverde del Fresno (Valverdi du Fresnu), Eljas (As Ellas) and San Martín de Trevejo (Sa Martín de Trevellu) in the autonomous community of Extremadura, near the border with Portugal.

There are a number of other places in Spain in which the native language of the common people is a descendant of the Galician-Portuguese group, such as La Alamedilla, Cedillo (Cedilho), Herrera de Alcántara (Ferreira d'Alcântara) and Olivenza (Olivença), but in these municipalities, what is spoken is actually Portuguese, not disputed as such in the mainstream.

The diversity of dialects of the Portuguese language is known since the time of medieval Portuguese-Galician language when it coexisted with the Lusitanian-Mozarabic dialect, spoken in the south of Portugal. The dialectal diversity becomes more evident in the work of Fernão d'Oliveira, in the Grammatica da Lingoagem Portuguesa, (1536), where he remarks that the people of Portuguese regions of Beira, Alentejo, Estremadura, and Entre Douro e Minho, all speak differently from each other. Also Contador d'Argote (1725) distinguishes three main varieties of dialects: the local dialects, the dialects of time, and of profession (work jargon). Of local dialects he highlights five main dialects: the dialect of Estremadura, of Entre-Douro e Minho, of Beira, of Algarve and of Trás-os-Montes. He also makes reference to the overseas dialects, the rustic dialects, the poetic dialect and that of prose.

In the kingdom of Portugal, Ladinho (or Lingoagem Ladinha) was the name given to the pure Portuguese romance language, without any mixture of Aravia or Gerigonça Judenga. While the term língua vulgar was used to name the language before D. Dinis decided to call it "Portuguese language", the erudite version used and known as Galician-Portuguese (the language of the Portuguese court) and all other Portuguese dialects were spoken at the same time. In a historical perspective the Portuguese language was never just one dialect. Just like today there is a standard Portuguese (actually two) among the several dialects of Portuguese, in the past there was Galician-Portuguese as the "standard", coexisting with other dialects.

Influence on other languages 
 

Portuguese has provided loanwords to many languages, such as Indonesian, Manado Malay, Malayalam, Sri Lankan Tamil and Sinhala, Malay, Bengali, English, Hindi, Swahili, Afrikaans, Konkani, Marathi, Punjabi, Tetum, Xitsonga, Japanese, Lanc-Patuá, Esan, Bandari (spoken in Iran) and Sranan Tongo (spoken in Suriname). It left a strong influence on the língua brasílica, a Tupi–Guarani language, which was the most widely spoken in Brazil until the 18th century, and on the language spoken around Sikka in Flores Island, Indonesia. In nearby Larantuka, Portuguese is used for prayers in Holy Week rituals.
The Japanese–Portuguese dictionary Nippo Jisho (1603) was the first dictionary of Japanese in a European language, a product of Jesuit missionary activity in Japan. Building on the work of earlier Portuguese missionaries, the Dictionarium Anamiticum, Lusitanum et Latinum (Annamite–Portuguese–Latin dictionary) of Alexandre de Rhodes (1651) introduced the modern orthography of Vietnamese, which is based on the orthography of 17th-century Portuguese. The Romanization of Chinese was also influenced by the Portuguese language (among others), particularly regarding Chinese surnames; one example is Mei. During 1583–88 Italian Jesuits Michele Ruggieri and Matteo Ricci created a Portuguese–Chinese dictionary – the first ever European–Chinese dictionary.

For instance, as Portuguese merchants were presumably the first to introduce the sweet orange in Europe, in several modern Indo-European languages the fruit has been named after them. Some examples are Albanian portokall, Bosnian (archaic) portokal, prtokal, Bulgarian портокал (portokal), Greek πορτοκάλι (portokáli), Macedonian , Persian پرتقال (porteghal), and Romanian portocală. Related names can be found in other languages, such as Arabic البرتقال (burtuqāl), Georgian ფორთოხალი (p'ort'oxali), Turkish portakal and Amharic birtukan. Also, in southern Italian dialects (e.g. Neapolitan), an orange is portogallo or purtuallo, literally "(the) Portuguese (one)", in contrast to standard Italian arancia.

Derived languages 

Beginning in the 16th century, the extensive contacts between Portuguese travelers and settlers, African and Asian slaves, and local populations led to the appearance of many pidgins with varying amounts of Portuguese influence.

As each of these pidgins became the mother tongue of succeeding generations, they evolved into fully fledged creole languages, which remained in use in many parts of Asia, Africa and South America until the 18th century. 

Some Portuguese-based or Portuguese-influenced creoles are still spoken today, by over 3 million people worldwide, especially people of partial Portuguese ancestry.

Phonology 

Portuguese phonology is similar to those of languages such as Catalan and Franco-Provençal, whereas that of Spanish is similar to those of Sardinian and the Southern Italian dialects. Some would describe the phonology of Portuguese as a blend of Spanish, Gallo-Romance (e.g. French) and the languages of northern Italy (especially Genoese).

There is a maximum of 9 oral vowels, 2 semivowels and 21 consonants; though some varieties of the language have fewer phonemes. There are also five nasal vowels, which some linguists regard as allophones of the oral vowels. Galician-Portuguese developed in the region of the former Roman province of Gallaecia, from the Vulgar Latin (common Latin) that had been introduced by Roman soldiers, colonists and magistrates during the time of the Roman Empire. Although the process may have been slower than in other regions, the centuries of contact with Vulgar Latin, after a period of bilingualism, completely extinguished the native languages, leading to the evolution of a new variety of Latin with a few Gallaecian features.

Gallaecian and Lusitanian influences were absorbed into the local Vulgar Latin dialect, which can be detected in some Galician-Portuguese words as well as in placenames of Celtic and Iberian origin.

An early form of Galician-Portuguese was already spoken in the Kingdom of the Suebi and by the year 800 Galician-Portuguese had already become the vernacular of northwestern Iberia. The first known phonetic changes in Vulgar Latin, which began the evolution to Galician-Portuguese, took place during the rule of the Germanic groups, the Suebi (411–585) and Visigoths (585–711). The Galician-Portuguese "inflected infinitive" (or "personal infinitive") and the nasal vowels may have evolved under the influence of local  Celtic (as in Old French). The nasal vowels would thus be a phonologic characteristic of the Vulgar Latin spoken in Roman Gallaecia, but they are not attested in writing until after the 6th and 7th centuries.

Vowels 

Like Catalan and German, Portuguese uses vowel quality to contrast stressed syllables with unstressed syllables. Unstressed isolated vowels tend to be raised and sometimes centralized.

Consonants 

Phonetic notes
 Semivowels contrast with unstressed high vowels in verbal conjugation, as in (eu) rio  and (ele) riu . Phonologists discuss whether their nature is vowel or consonant.
 The consonant hereafter denoted as  has a variety of realizations depending on dialect. In Europe, it is typically a uvular trill ; however, a pronunciation as a voiced uvular fricative  may be becoming dominant in urban areas. There is also a realization as a voiceless uvular fricative , and the original pronunciation as an alveolar trill  also remains very common in various dialects. A common realization of the word-initial  in the Lisbon accent is a voiced uvular fricative trill . In Brazil,  can be velar, uvular, or glottal and may be voiceless unless between voiced sounds. It is usually pronounced as a voiceless velar fricative , a voiceless glottal fricative  or voiceless uvular fricative . See also Guttural R in Portuguese.
A very few northeastern Portugal dialects still maintain the medieval distinction between apical and laminal sibilants (written s/ss and c/ç/z, respectively).
However,  is an allophone of  before  in a number of Brazilian dialects.
(A very similar evolution happened in Polish.)

Grammar 

A notable aspect of the grammar of Portuguese is the verb. Morphologically, more verbal inflections from classical Latin have been preserved by Portuguese than by any other major Romance language. Portuguese and Spanish share very similar grammar. Portuguese also has some grammatical innovations not found in other Romance languages (except Galician and Fala):
 The present perfect has an iterative sense unique to the Galician-Portuguese language group. It denotes an action or a series of actions that began in the past but expected to occur again in the future. For instance, the sentence Tenho tentado falar consigo would be translated to "I have been trying to talk to you", not "I have tried to talk to you." On the other hand, the correct translation of "Have you heard the latest news?" is not *Tens ouvido as últimas? but Ouviste as últimas? since no repetition is implied.
 Portuguese makes use of the future subjunctive mood, which developed from medieval West Iberian Romance. In modern Spanish and Galician, it has almost entirely fallen into disuse. The future subjunctive appears in dependent clauses that denote a condition that must be fulfilled in the future so that the independent clause will occur. English normally employs the present tense under the same circumstances:

Se eu for eleito presidente, mudarei a lei.
If I am elected president, I will change the law.

Quando fores mais velho, vais entender.
When you grow older, you will understand.
 The personal infinitive can inflect according to its subject in person and number. It often shows who is expected to perform a certain action. É melhor voltares "It is better [for you] to go back," É melhor voltarmos "It is better [for us] to go back." Perhaps for that reason, infinitive clauses replace subjunctive clauses more often in Portuguese than in other Romance languages.

Writing system

Sample text 
Article 1 of the Universal Declaration of Human Rights in Portuguese:

Article 1 of the Universal Declaration of Human Rights in English:
All human beings are born free and equal in dignity and rights. They are endowed with reason and conscience and should act towards one another in a spirit of brotherhood.

See also 

 Portuguese literature
 Portuguese Africans
 Angolan literature
 Brazilian literature
 Gallaecian language
Indo-Portuguese
 Galician Reintegrationism
 International Portuguese Language Institute
 List of countries and territories where Portuguese is an official language
 List of international organizations which have Portuguese as an official language
 List of Portuguese-language poets
 Lusitanian language
 Mozambican Portuguese
 Portuguese language in Asia
 Portuguese Language Orthographic Agreement of 1990
 Portuguese poetry

References

Citations

Sources 

 História da Lingua Portuguesa – Instituto Camões website 
 A Língua Portuguesa in Universidade Federal do Rio Grande do Norte, Brazil
 Carta de dotação e fundação da Igreja de S. Miguel de Lardosa, a.D. 882 (o mais antigo documento latino-português original conhecido)  

 Literature

 Poesia e Prosa Medievais, by Maria Ema Tarracha Ferreira, Ulisseia 1998, 3rd ed., .
 Bases Temáticas – Língua, Literatura e Cultura Portuguesa in Instituto Camões 
 Portuguese literature in The Catholic Encyclopedia 

 Phonology, orthography and grammar

 
 Bergström, Magnus & Reis, Neves Prontuário Ortográfico Editorial Notícias, 2004.
 
 
 
 
 
 
 A pronúncia do português europeu – European Portuguese Pronunciation  - Instituto Camões website
 Dialects of Portuguese  – Instituto Camões website
 Audio samples of the dialects of Portugal  – Instituto Camões website
 Audio samples of the dialects from outside Europe  – Instituto Camões website
 Portuguese Grammar  – Learn101.org

 Reference dictionaries

 Antônio Houaiss (2000), Dicionário Houaiss da Língua Portuguesa (228,500 entries).
 Aurélio Buarque de Holanda Ferreira, Novo Dicionário da Língua Portuguesa (1809 pp.)
 English–Portuguese–Chinese Dictionary (Freeware for Windows/Linux/Mac)

 Linguistic studies

 Cook, Manuela. Portuguese Pronouns and Other Forms of Address, from the Past into the Future – Structural, Semantic and Pragmatic Reflections, Ellipsis, vol. 11, APSA, www.portuguese-apsa.com/ellipsis, 2013
 
 Cook, Manuela. On the Portuguese Forms of Address: From Vossa Mercê to Você, Portuguese Studies Review 3.2, Durham: University of New Hampshire, 1995
 Lindley Cintra, Luís F. Nova Proposta de Classificação dos Dialectos Galego- Portugueses  (PDF) Boletim de Filologia, Lisboa, Centro de Estudos Filológicos, 1971.

External links 
 

 
Languages attested from the 9th century
Fusional languages
Community of Portuguese Language Countries
Languages of Angola
Languages of Brazil
Languages of Cape Verde
Languages of East Timor
Languages of Guinea-Bissau
Languages of Macau
Languages of Mozambique
Languages of Portugal
Languages of São Tomé and Príncipe
Languages of India
Lingua francas
Subject–verb–object languages
Articles containing video clips